Maria Vassilakou (born 23 February 1969) is an Austrian Green Party politician originating from Lakonia. From 25 November 2010 until 26 June 2019 she served as Deputy Mayor and Deputy Governor of Vienna (Vizebürgermeisterin und Landeshauptmann-Stv.in), as well as Executive Councillor for Urban Planning, Traffic & Transport, Climate Protection, Energy Planning and Public Participation (Stadtentwicklung, Verkehr, Klimaschutz, Energieplanung und BürgerInnenbeteiligung). Her successor is Green Party politician Birgit Hebein.

References 

1969 births
Living people
The Greens – The Green Alternative politicians
Austrian people of Greek descent
Naturalised citizens of Austria